The Intersport Cup 2019 was a friendly women's handball tournament held in Stavanger, Norway at the DBN Arena between 23–29 September, organised by the Norwegian Handball Federation as preparation for the home team for the 2019 World Women's Handball Championship and named Intersport for sponsorship reasons.

Results

Round robin
All times are local (UTC+2).

Final standing

References

External links
Norges Håndballforbund Official Website

Intersport Cup
Handball competitions in Norway
Intersport Cup